Cecidosidae is a family of primitive monotrysian moths in the order Lepidoptera which have a piercing ovipositor used for laying eggs in plant tissue in which they induce galls, or they mine in bark (Davis, 1999; Hoare and Dugdale, 2003). Nine species occur in southern Africa, five species in South America (Parra, 1998) and  Xanadoses nielseni was recently described from New Zealand (Hoare and Dugdale, 2003). Some minute parasitoid wasps are known (Burks et al., 2005).

References

Burks, R.A. Gibson, G.A.P. and La Salle, J. (2005). Nomenclatural changes in Neotropical Eulophidae, Eupelmidae and Torymidae (Hymenoptera: Chalcidoidea) relating to parasitoids of Cecidoses eremita (Lepidoptera: Cecidosidae). Zootaxa, 1082: 45–55.pdf.
Davis, D.R. (1999). The Monotrysian Heteroneura. Ch. 6, pp. 65–90 in Kristensen, N.P. (Ed.). Lepidoptera, Moths and Butterflies. Volume 1: Evolution, Systematics, and Biogeography. Handbuch der Zoologie. Eine Naturgeschichte der Stämme des Tierreiches / Handbook of Zoology. A Natural History of the phyla of the Animal Kingdom. Band / Volume IV Arthropoda: Insecta Teilband / Part 35: 491 pp. Walter de Gruyter, Berlin, New York.
Hoare, R.J.B. and Dugdale, J.S. (2003). Description of the New Zealand incurvarioid Xanadoses nielseni, gen. nov., sp. nov. and placement in Cecidosidae (Lepidoptera). Invertebrate Systematics, 17(1): 47–57.
Parra, L.E. (1998). A redescription of Cecidoses argentinana (Cecidosidae) and its early stages, with comments on its taxonomic position. Nota Lepidopterologica,  21(3): 206–214.

External links
Tree of Life
Hayawani tree
Available generic names from Natural History Museum Lepidoptera genus database

 
Moth families
Taxa named by Juan Brèthes